Anarithma drivasi is a species of sea snail, a marine gastropod mollusk in the family Mitromorphidae.

Description
The length of the shell attains 5 mm.

Distribution
This marine species occurs off Taiwan

References

 Zhang Z.g. [Zhenguo] [= Chang C.K.] (1995) Studies on micromolluscan Turridae of Ludau Islet, Taiwan. Studia Marina Sinica 36: 273-296
 Liu J.Y. [Ruiyu] (ed.). (2008). Checklist of marine biota of China seas. China Science Press. 1267 pp.

External links
 

drivasi
Gastropods described in 1995